The 1996 Prix de l'Arc de Triomphe was a horse race held at Longchamp on Sunday 6 October 1996. It was the 75th running of the Prix de l'Arc de Triomphe.

The winner was Helissio, a three-year-old colt trained in France by Élie Lellouche. The winning jockey was Olivier Peslier.

Race details
 Sponsor: Forte Group
 Purse: 7,000,000 F; First prize: 4,000,000 F
 Going: Good to Soft
 Distance: 2,400 metres
 Number of runners: 16
 Winner's time: 2m 29.9s

Full result

 Abbreviations: shd = short-head; snk = short-neck; nk = neck; SU = slipped up

Winner's details
Further details of the winner, Helissio.
 Sex: Colt
 Foaled: 24 January 1993
 Country: France
 Sire: Fairy King; Dam: Helice (Slewpy)
 Owner: Enrique Sarasola
 Breeder: Ecurie Skymarc Farm

References

External links
 Colour Chart – Arc 1996

Prix de l'Arc de Triomphe
 1996
Prix de l'Arc de Triomphe
Prix de l'Arc de Triomphe
Prix de l'Arc de Triomphe